Mavrlen (in older sources also Maverl) is a settlement in the hills west of Črnomelj in the White Carniola area of southeastern Slovenia. The area is part of the traditional region of Lower Carniola and is now included in the Southeast Slovenia Statistical Region.

In the 16th century the village was settled by Gottschee Germans, who remained in the settlement until 1941.

In September 2017, a 71-year-old woman was mauled to death by three pit bulls in Mavrlen.

References

External links
Mavrlen on Geopedia
Pre–World War II map of Mavrlen with oeconyms and family names

Populated places in the Municipality of Črnomelj